This is a list of opera houses and associated opera companies in Chicago.

Current
The main opera house in Chicago, Illinois, is currently the Civic Opera Building (1929), whose resident company since 1954 has been the Lyric Opera of Chicago.

 Chicago Opera Theater, founded as Chicago Opera Studio in 1974, resident at the Harris Theater
 Lithuanian Opera Company of Chicago, founded by Lithuanian emigrants in 1956 for presenting operas in Lithuanian

History of Chicago opera houses and associated companies
 Crosby's Opera House (1865–1871) was an opera house in Chicago, Illinois, founded by Uranus H. Crosby, destroyed by fire
 Grand Opera House (1872–1958), built at 546 N. Clark Street (119 N. Clark Street today) by John Austin Hamlin
 Chicago Opera House (1885–1913) constructed in 1884–5, demolished in May 1913
 Auditorium Theatre, situated within the Auditorium Building, Chicago (1889), bowling alley for US servicemen 1941–45, re-opened in 1967 
 Chicago Grand Opera Company (1910–1915), Chicago's first resident opera company, produced four seasons of opera in Chicago’s Auditorium Theater from the fall of 1910 through November 1915.
 Chicago Opera Association, produced seven seasons of grand opera in Chicago’s Auditorium Theater from 1915 to 1921, bankrupted by the soprano Mary Garden
 Chicago Civic Opera at the Auditorium Theater from 1922 to 1928, and at its own Civic Opera House from 1929 to 1931 
 Civic Opera House (Chicago) opened 4 November 1929, with Chicago Civic Opera as resident company until 1931
 Chicago Grand Opera Company gave three seasons of opera at the Civic Opera House from 1933 to 1935, after the collapse of the Chicago Civic Opera in 1932 
 Chicago City Opera Company produced five seasons at Civic Opera House from 1935 to 1939, succumbed to financial difficulties, succeeded by the Chicago Opera Company.
 Chicago Opera Company, based around Fortune Gallo's San Carlo Opera Company (1910–1954): gave six seasons of opera at the Civic Opera House from 1940 to 1946 (excluding 1943)
 There was no resident opera company in Chicago between 1946 and 1953
 Lyric Opera of Chicago, founded in 1954 as 'Lyric Theatre of Chicago' changed to its present name in 1956

See also
Thalia Hall (Chicago), an auditorium built in 1892